John Richard Cooper (born 4 November 1946) is a former Australian male tennis player who played on the ATP tour in the 1970s. He reached the quarterfinals of Wimbledon in 1967 and the Australian Open in 1972 and 1973. Other career highlights include finishing runner-up in 1973 Wimbledon Championships Doubles tournament and a singles victory at Hilversum in 1972. Cooper was also on the winning Davis Cup team in 1973.

He is the younger brother of four-time Grand Slam tournament winner Ashley Cooper.

Statistics
Match record
Titles and Finals
Rankings history

Playing activity
Singles: 1973, 1974, 1975

Doubles: 1973, 
1974, 
1975

See also
List of male tennis players

References

External links
 
 

1946 births
Living people
Australian male tennis players
People from Alexandra, Victoria
Tennis people from Victoria (Australia)
20th-century Australian people
21st-century Australian people